Kyes is a surname. Notable people with the surname include: 

James E. Kyes (1906–1943), American naval officer
Katharine Kyes Leab (1941–2020), American publisher
Nancy Kyes (born 1949), American actress
Roger M. Kyes (1906–1971), American business executive, and US Deputy Secretary of Defense, 1953